Frederick Robertson McLeod (25 April 1882 – 8 May 1976) was a Scottish-American professional golfer who had a distinguished career in the United States, which included victory in the 1908 U.S. Open. He was born in Kirk Ports, North Berwick, East Lothian, Scotland.

Biography
McLeod's mother was from Bolton in East Lothian and his father Neil was from the Isle of Skye. His father was employed as the manager of a temperance book stall and also worked as a caddie. McLeod began his working life as a postman at the age of fourteen. At seventeen he joined the Bass Rock Golf Club in North Berwick, which was a club for artisans. It did not have its own course and the members played on a public links. McLeod soon had some success in local competitions, and in 1903 he left for the United States to try his luck as a golf professional there, a route followed by many other Scots around that time as the golf clubs which were springing up rapidly in the U.S. had no experienced local professionals on whom they could call. He quickly found employment at the Rockford Country Club in Illinois, and later worked at several other clubs.

Despite not having been a leading player in Scotland, McLeod soon made a name for himself as a first rate tournament player in the U.S. He acquired the nickname "the wasp" from fellow American professionals. He entered his first U.S. Open within weeks of his arrival in America, and later that year he was fifth at the Western Open. He won the Riverside Open in 1905 and the Western PGA Championship in both 1905 and 1907. The principal achievement of his career was his victory in the 1908 U.S. Open at Myopia Hunt Club in South Hamilton, Massachusetts. He was level with Willie Smith after four rounds, but won the playoff by 77 shots to 83. McLeod was five feet four inches tall, and at the end of the tournament he was weighed at 7 stone 10 pounds (108 pounds, 49 kilograms), making him the smallest man ever to take the title. He competed in the U.S. Open twenty-two times and had eight top ten finishes.

McLeod won several more professional tournaments: the 1909 and 1920 North and South Open at Pinehurst, the 1912 Shawnee Open, the 1924 St. Petersburg Open and the 1927 Maryland Open. In 1919 he was runner up to Jim Barnes in the PGA Championship. He took part in both the 1921 challenge match between teams of U.S based and British based professionals at Gleneagles, Perth and Kinross, Scotland, and in the follow-up 1926 match which was the immediate precursor of the first Ryder Cup match in 1927. During this period McLeod wintered at Temple Terrace, Florida (1925–26) where he worked with James Thomson from North Berwick. It was in Florida that McLeod was involved in the first 'Professional Golf League' in 1925. As the number of golf courses increased, many of top professionals were signed up in the winter months to represent the Florida clubs in a team competition. Walter Hagen and Joe Kirkwood, Sr. were signed up to Pasadena Country Club, Jim Barnes and Fred McLeod played for Temple Terrace Golf and Country Club and Gene Sarazen and Leo Diegel represented Hollywood Country Club.  Although exhibition matches were still popular, this team format increased the players' earnings as they received 60% of the $2 entrance fee paid by spectators at the gate. At Augusta National Golf Club, he played in the first four editions of the Masters Tournament from 1934–37, won the 1938 PGA Seniors' Championship held there, and acted as an honorary starter at the Masters from 1963 to 1976. He was a member of the group of senior professionals which established the senior division of the PGA of America in 1937.

McLeod died in Washington, D.C., at the age of 94. He was buried at the last club where he had worked as a professional, Columbia Country Club, in Chevy Chase, Maryland.

Major championships

Wins (1)

1 Defeated Willie Smith in an 18-hole playoff – McLeod (77), Smith (83)

Results timeline

NYF = Tournament not yet founded
NT = No tournament
WD = Withdrew
CUT = missed the half-way cut
R64, R32, R16, QF, SF = Round in which player lost in PGA Championship match play
"T" indicates a tie for a place

References

External links
North Berwick Golfers profile

Scottish male golfers
American male golfers
Winners of men's major golf championships
Golfers from Maryland
Scottish emigrants to the United States
Golfers from North Berwick
1882 births
1976 deaths